The Beiușele is a right tributary of the river Nimăiești in Romania. It flows into the Nimăiești in the village Nimăiești.

References

Rivers of Romania
Rivers of Bihor County